Violet Albina Gibson (31 August 1876 – 2 May 1956) was an Irish woman who attempted to assassinate Benito Mussolini in 1926. She was released without charge but spent the rest of her life in a psychiatric hospital in England.

She was the daughter of Lord Ashbourne, Lord Chancellor of Ireland.

Early life
Violet Gibson was born in Dublin, Ireland, on 31 August 1876. Her father was an Irish lawyer and politician, Edward Gibson, who was created Baron Ashbourne in 1885. Her mother, Frances, was a Christian Scientist. Violet experimented with Theosophy before becoming a Roman Catholic in 1902. She was presented as a debutante at court during the reign of Queen Victoria.

Gibson suffered severe ill health throughout her life. She had a nervous breakdown in 1922; she was declared insane and committed to a mental institution for two years. She attempted suicide in Rome in early 1925.

Shooting of Mussolini

On 7 April 1926, Gibson shot Mussolini, Italy's Fascist leader, as he walked among the crowd in the Piazza del Campidoglio in Rome after leaving an assembly of the International Congress of Surgeons, to whom he had delivered a speech on the wonders of modern medicine. Gibson had armed herself with a rock to break Mussolini's car window if necessary, and a Modèle 1892 revolver disguised in a black shawl. She fired once, but Mussolini moved his head at that moment and the shot hit his nose; she tried again, but the gun misfired.  Mussolini's son, in his memoir, gives an alternative account, recounting that Gibson fired twice, once missing and once grazing Mussolini's nose.  Gibson was almost lynched on the spot by an angry mob, but police intervened and took her away for questioning. Mussolini was wounded only slightly, dismissing his injury as "a mere trifle", and after his nose was bandaged he continued his parade on the Capitoline Hill.

It has been thought that Gibson was insane at the time of the attack and the idea of assassinating Mussolini was hers and that she worked alone. She told interrogators that she shot Mussolini "to glorify God" who had kindly sent an angel to keep her arm steady. She was deported to Britain after being released without charge at the request of Mussolini, an act for which he received the thanks of the British government. The assassination attempt triggered a wave of popular support for Mussolini, resulting in much oppressive legislation, consolidating his control of Italy. She spent the rest of her life in a psychiatric hospital, St Andrew's Hospital in Northampton, despite repeated pleas for her release. She died on 2 May 1956 and was buried in Kingsthorpe Cemetery, Northampton.

Legacy 

The Irishwoman Who Shot Mussolini, a 2014 radio documentary, was made by Siobhán Lynam for RTÉ Radio 1. A film drama documentary, Violet Gibson, The Irish Woman Who Shot Mussolini (2020) starring Olwen Fouéré, was commissioned by TG4 and produced by Barrie Dowdall and Siobhán Lynam. Gibson's story is the subject of Alice Barry's play Violet Gibson: The Woman Who Shot Mussolini.

Lisa O'Neill's song "Violet Gibson" celebrates her. It is featured on O'Neill's album Heard a Long Gone Song. Evelyn Conlon's short story "Dear You" provides an epistolary account of events from Gibson's point of view. The story first appeared in both Italian and English in Tratti Review (Numero Novantatre, Italy, May 2013), and subsequently in Accenti: The Magazine with an Italian Accent (Canada). It also appears in Conlon's Moving About the Place Collection (Blackstaff, 2021). In March 2021 Dublin City Council approved the placement of a plaque on her childhood home in Merrion Square to commemorate Gibson as "a committed anti-fascist". This was unveiled in October 2022.

See also
Assassination attempts on Benito Mussolini

References

External links

"The Woman Who Shot Mussolini", telegraph.co.uk
"The Woman Who Shot Mussolini", guardian.co.uk
 "The Woman Who Shot Mussolini", bbc.co.uk
 "The Irishwoman Who Shot Mussolini", rte.ie, 21 June 2014

Further reading 
 Saunders, Frances Stonor The Woman Who Shot Mussolini. New York: Metropolitan Books/Henry Holt and, 2010.

1876 births
1956 deaths
British debutantes
Irish assassins
Failed assassins
People from Dublin (city)
Converts to Roman Catholicism
Daughters of barons
Angelic visionaries